Murguk is a rural locality (a selo) in Sergokalinsky District, Republic of Dagestan, Russia. The population was 1,643 as of 2010. There is 1 street.

Geography 
Murguk is located 105 km south of Makhachkala. Baltamakhi and Kanasiragi are the nearest rural localities.

Nationalities 
Dargins live there.

Famous residents 
 Ramazan Shakhnavazov (Prosecutor of the Republic of Dagestan)

References 

Rural localities in Sergokalinsky District